Najma (Arabic: نجمة) or Al-Najma may refer to:

Women with the given name
Najma Akhtar (born 1964), British singer of Indian ancestry
Najma Akhtar (academic) (born 1953), Indian academic and academic administrator
Najma Begum (born 1967), Pakistani politician member of the National Assembly of the Punjab
Najma Chowdhury (1942–2021), Bangladesh academic
Najma Hameed, Pakistani politician, member of Senate of Pakistan
Najma Heptulla (born 1940), Indian politician, Governor if Manipur
Najma Idrees (born 1952), Kuwaiti poet, writer and academic
Najma Kousri, Tunisian lawyer, journalist, feminist, LGBT activist
Najma Parveen (born 1990), Pakistani sprinter
 Najma Mehboob (1949–1983), Pakistani actress
 Najma (actress), Pakistani film actress

Places
Najma (Doha), a district in Qatar

Arts and entertainment
Najma (1943 film), an Indian film
Najma (1983 film), a Bangladeshi film

Sports
 Al-Nejmeh (disambiguation), number of sports clubs
Nejmeh SC, a Lebanese football club
Al-Najma SC (Bahrain), a Bahraini multi-sports club
Al-Najma SC (Saudi Arabia), a Saudi Arabian football club
Annajma SC, a Libyan football club

See also
 Najm
 Najima (disambiguation)